Michael Zacho Jørgensen (born 11 November 1996) is a retired Danish footballer.

Club career

AGF
Zacho joined AGF at the age of 12. Already at the age of 14, Zacho had trained with Liverpool and one year after, he signed a contract with AGF as well.

On 30 May 2015, Zacho got his professional debut for AGF, in a match against Lyngby BK. Zacho started on the bench, but replaces Davit Skhirtladze in the 76nd minute.

On 18 May 2018, AGF announced that Zacho alongside two other teammates, would leave the club in the summer, where their contract was expiring.

On loan from Brabrand IF
On 25 January 2018, Zacho was loaned out to Brabrand IF for the rest of the season.

References

External links
 Michael Zacho on Soccerway
 Michael Zacho on DBU

1996 births
Living people
Danish men's footballers
Association football midfielders
Danish Superliga players
Aarhus Gymnastikforening players
Denmark youth international footballers
Sportspeople from Aarhus